Kirill Sergeyevich Kurochkin (born 30 June 1988) is a former Russian footballer.

Career
He made his debut for FC Dynamo Moscow in a Russian Cup game against FC Zenit St. Petersburg on 8 August 2007. Dynamo lost 3–9.

Personal life
In February 2017, he was convicted of drug possession and given a 3-year suspended sentence. His suspended sentence was extended in the summer 2018 to 2020 due to another drug possession charge.

References

1988 births
People from Saransk
Living people
Russian footballers
Russia youth international footballers
Association football midfielders
FC Dynamo Moscow players
FC Metallurg Lipetsk players
FC Mordovia Saransk players
Sportspeople from Mordovia